Crime in San Francisco is a long-running public health and public safety issue.  

In 2011, 50 murders were reported, which is 6.1 per 100,000 people. There were about 134 rapes, 3,142 robberies, and about 2,139 assaults. There were about 4,469 burglaries, 25,100 thefts, and 4,210 motor vehicle thefts. The Tenderloin area has the highest crime rate in San Francisco: 70% of the city's violent crimes, and around one-fourth of the city's murders, occur in this neighborhood. The Tenderloin also sees high rates of drug abuse, gang violence, and prostitution. Another area with high crime rates is the Bayview-Hunters Point area. In the first six months of 2015 there were 25 murders compared to 14 in the first six months of 2014. However, the murder rate is still much lower than in past decades. That rate, though, did rise again by the close of 2016. According to the San Francisco Police Department, there were 59 murders in the city in 2016, an annual total that marked a 13.5% increase in the number of homicides (52) from 2015.

In November 2021, San Francisco District Attorney Chesa Boudin’s office stated that about 2% of auto burglaries in San Francisco result in an arrest.

In September 2022, the San Francisco Chronicle reported that a poll of 1,653 city residents found that over the past five years, 45% of San Francisco residents had been the victim of theft and 24% had been either been threatened with violence or had been the victim of a violent crime.

Gangs
Several street gangs have operated in the city over the decades, including MS-13, the Sureños and Norteños in the Mission District. In 2008, a MS-13 member killed three family members as they were arriving home in the city's Excelsior District. His victims had no relationship with him, nor did they have any known gang or street crime involvement.

African-American street gangs familiar in other cities, including the Bloods, Crips and their sets, have struggled to establish footholds in San Francisco, while police and prosecutors have been accused of liberally labeling young African-American males as gang members. However, gangs founded in San Francisco with majority Black memberships have made their presence in the city. The gang Westmob, associated with Oakdale Mob and Sunnydale housing project gangs from the southeast area of the city, was involved in a gang war with Hunters Point-based Big Block from 1999 to the 2000s. They claim territory from West Point to Middle Point in the Hunters Point projects. In 2004, a Westmob member fatally shot a SFPD officer and wounded his partner; he was sentenced to life without parole in 2007.

Criminal gangs with shotcallers in China, including Triad groups such as the Wo Hop To, have been reported active in San Francisco. In 1977, an ongoing rivalry between two Chinese gangs led to a shooting attack at the Golden Dragon restaurant in Chinatown, which left 5 people dead and 11 wounded. None of the victims in this attack were gang members. Five members of the Joe Boys gang were arrested and convicted of the crime. In 1990, a gang-related shooting killed one man and wounded six others outside a nightclub near Chinatown. In 1998, six teenagers were shot and wounded at the Chinese Playground; a 16-year-old boy was subsequently arrested.

Incidents

November 2021 large scale smash and grab robberies 
San Francisco's Louis Vuitton store in Union Square was "emptied out" by thieves Friday night, November 19, 2021, witnesses posted to social media.
District 3 Supervisor Aaron Peskin, who represents the area, confirmed that six suspects have been arrested by San Francisco Police Department's Central Station officers. He said they did "great work" and that there were no injuries.  Many other high-end retail stores were robbed, including Apple, Louis Vuitton, Fendi, Burberry, and Dolce & Gabbana.

References

See also

Attempted assassination of Gerald Ford in San Francisco
History of the San Francisco Police Department
Resolve to Stop Violence Project
San Francisco Committee of Vigilance
San Francisco District Attorney's Office

History of San Francisco
Crime in San Francisco
Law enforcement in California
San Francisco Police Department
History of law enforcement in the United States
Law enforcement in the San Francisco Bay Area